This bibliography of Andrew Johnson is a list of major works about Andrew Johnson, the 17th president of the United States.

Scholarly and popular studies

 Bailey, Thomas A. "Why the United States Purchased Alaska." Pacific Historical Review 3.1 (1934): 39–49. online
 Benedict, Michael Les. The Impeachment and Trial of Andrew Johnson] (1999). 
 Boulard, Garry. The Swing Around the Circle—Andrew Johnson and the Train Ride that Destroyed a Presidency (2008) 
 Broomall, James J. "Ulysses S. Grant Goes to Washington: The Commanding General as Secretary of War." in A Companion to the Reconstruction Presidents 1865–1881 (2014) pp: 214-234.
 Castel, Albert. The Presidency of Andrew Johnson (University Press of Kansas, 1979), a major scholarly study.
 Castel, Albert E. "Andrew Johnson". In Graff, Henry (ed.). The Presidents: A Reference History (7th ed. 2002). pp. 225–239 
 Cox, LaWanda C. and John Henry Cox. Politics, principle, and prejudice, 1865-1866: dilemma of Reconstruction America (Free Press, 1963).
 Fehrenbacher, Don E. "The making of a myth: Lincoln and the vice-presidential nomination in 1864." Civil War History 41.4 (1995): 273-290.
 Foner, Eric. Reconstruction: America's Unfinished Revolution (HarperCollins, 1988), a major scholarly survey; also in an abridged edition.
 Fuentes‐Rohwer, Luis. "The Impeachment of Andrew Johnson." in A Companion to the Reconstruction Presidents 1865–1881 (2014): 62-84.
 Gordon-Reed, Annette, Andrew Johnson (Times Books, 2011) 
 Harris, William C. "Andrew Johnson's First 'Swing Around the Circle': His Northern Campaign of 1863." Civil War History 35.2 (1989): 153-171. excerpt
, popular
 Kennedy, John F. Profiles in Courage (Harper & Brothers, 1956), popular
 Levine, Robert S. The Failed Promise: Reconstruction, Frederick Douglass, and the Impeachment of Andrew Johnson (2021) excerpt
 Mantell, Martin E. Johnson, Grant, and the Politics of Reconstruction (1973)
 McKitrick, Eric L. Andrew Johnson and Reconstruction (1961). 
 Means, Howard. The Avenger Takes His Place: Andrew Johnson and the 45 Days That Changed the Nation. (Houghton Mifflin Harcourt, 2006)
 Schroeder-Lein, Glenna R.; Zuczuk, Richard. Andrew Johnson: A Biographical Companion (ABC-CLIO, 2001). 
 
 Sledge, James L. III. "Johnson, Andrew," in Encyclopedia of the American Civil War. edited by David S. Heidler and Jeanne T. Heidler. (2000)
 Stewart, David O. Impeached: The Trial of President Andrew Johnson and the Fight for Lincoln's Legacy. (Simon & Schuster, 2009)
 Swanson, Ryan A. "Andrew Johnson and His Governors: An Examination of Failed Reconstruction Leadership." Tennessee Historical Quarterly 71.1 (2012): 16-45. online
 Trefousse, Hans Louis. Andrew Johnson: A Biography (WW Norton & Company, 1997), a major scholarly biography.
 Van Deusen, Glyndon. William Henry Seward (Oxford University Press, 1967), the Secretary of State.
 Wineapple, Brenda. The Impeachers: The Trial of Andrew Johnson and the Dream of a Just Nation. New York: Random House (2019).
 Zuczek, Richard. "Foreign Affairs and Andrew Johnson." in A Companion to the Reconstruction Presidents 1865–1881 (2014): 85-120.

Older studies
 Beale, Howard K. The Critical Year. A Study of Andrew Johnson and Reconstruction (1930). 
 DeWitt, D. M. The Impeachment and Trial of Andrew Johnson (1903).
 Du Bois, W. E. B. "The Transubstantiation of a Poor White", in Black Reconstruction: An Essay Toward the History of the Part Which Black People Have Played in the Attempt to Reconstruct Democracy in America, 1860–1880 (1935). .
 Dunning, W. A. Essays on the Civil War and Reconstruction (New York, 1898); outdated
 Dunning, W. A. Reconstruction, Political and Economic (New York, 1907) outdated
 Milton, George Fort. The Age of Hate: Andrew Johnson and the Radicals (1930), outdated 
 Patton, James Welch. Unionism and Reconstruction in Tennessee, 1860–1869 (1934) 
 Rhodes, James Ford. History of the United States from the Compromise of 1850 to the McKinley-Bryan Campaign of 1896] Volume: 6. 1920. Pulitzer Prize.
 Schouler, James.  History of the United States of America: Under the Constitution vol. 7. 1865–1877. The Reconstruction Period (1917)
 Stryker, Lloyd P. Andrew Johnson: A Study in Courage (1929).  outdated
 Winston, Robert W. Andrew Johnson: Plebeian and Patriot (1928), outdated

Unpublished PhD dissertations
These are online at academic libraries.

 Bowen, David Warren. "Andrew Johnson and the Negro." (University Of Tennessee; Proquest Dissertations Publishing, 1976. 7710753)
 Hager, Paul Alcott. "Andrew Johnson Of East Tennessee." (Johns Hopkins University; Proquest Dissertations Publishing, 1975. 7821961); detailed biography from birth to 1863.
 Halperin, Bernard Seymour. "Andrew Johnson, The Radicals, and the Negro, 1865-1866" (Florida State University; ProQuest Dissertations Publishing, 1966. 6708569).
 Hardison, Edwin T. "In the Toils of War: Andrew Johnson and the Federal Occupation of Tennessee, 1862-1865" (University of Tennessee; Proquest Dissertations Publishing, 1981. 8208968).
 Hayes, Merwyn Alfred. "The Andrew Johnson Impeachment Trial: A Case Study in Argumentation" (University of Illinois at Urbana-Champaign; ProQuest Dissertations Publishing, 1966. 6607749).

 McGuire, Tom. "Andrew Johnson and the northern revolution" (Columbia University; ProQuest Dissertations Publishing, 2007. 3266640), on his battles with Radical Republicans.
 O'Brien, John J., III. "The Mechanic Statesman and the Military Chieftain: Andrew Johnson, William B. Campbell and the Meaning of Liberty and Union in Antebellum Tennessee" (Saint Louis University ProQuest Dissertations Publishing, 2017. 10277975).
 Ortiz-Garcia, Angel Luis. "Andrew Johnson's Veto of the First Reconstruction Act" (Carnegie Mellon University; Proquest Dissertations Publishing, 1970. 7119112).
 Wedge, Lucius. "Andrew Johnson and the ministers of Nashville: A study in the relationship between war, politics, and morality" (University of Akron, ProQuest Dissertations Publishing, 2013. 3671127).

Primary sources
 Papers of Andrew Johnson (16 volumes, U of Tennessee Press) listing of published volumes
 vol 10 online 1866
 "Johnson, Andrew Papers (1846-1875)" finding aid to manuscripts at Tennessee State Library and Archives.

External links
Discussion with Annette Gordon-Reed on her book Andrew Johnson, February 8, 2011

Andrew Johnson
Johnson, Andrew
Johnson, Andrew
Johnson, Andrew